Tuxenidia is a genus of proturans in the family Acerentomidae.

Species
 Tuxenidia balcanica Nosek & Cvijovic, 1969
 Tuxenidia hermonensis Szeptycki & Broza, 2004

References

Protura